= Nese Group =

- Industry: Entertainment, gambling, lodging
- Founded: 1991
- Key people: Kazys Paulikas (Chairman)
- Products: Sports betting, poker, casino
- Website: nesegroup.eu

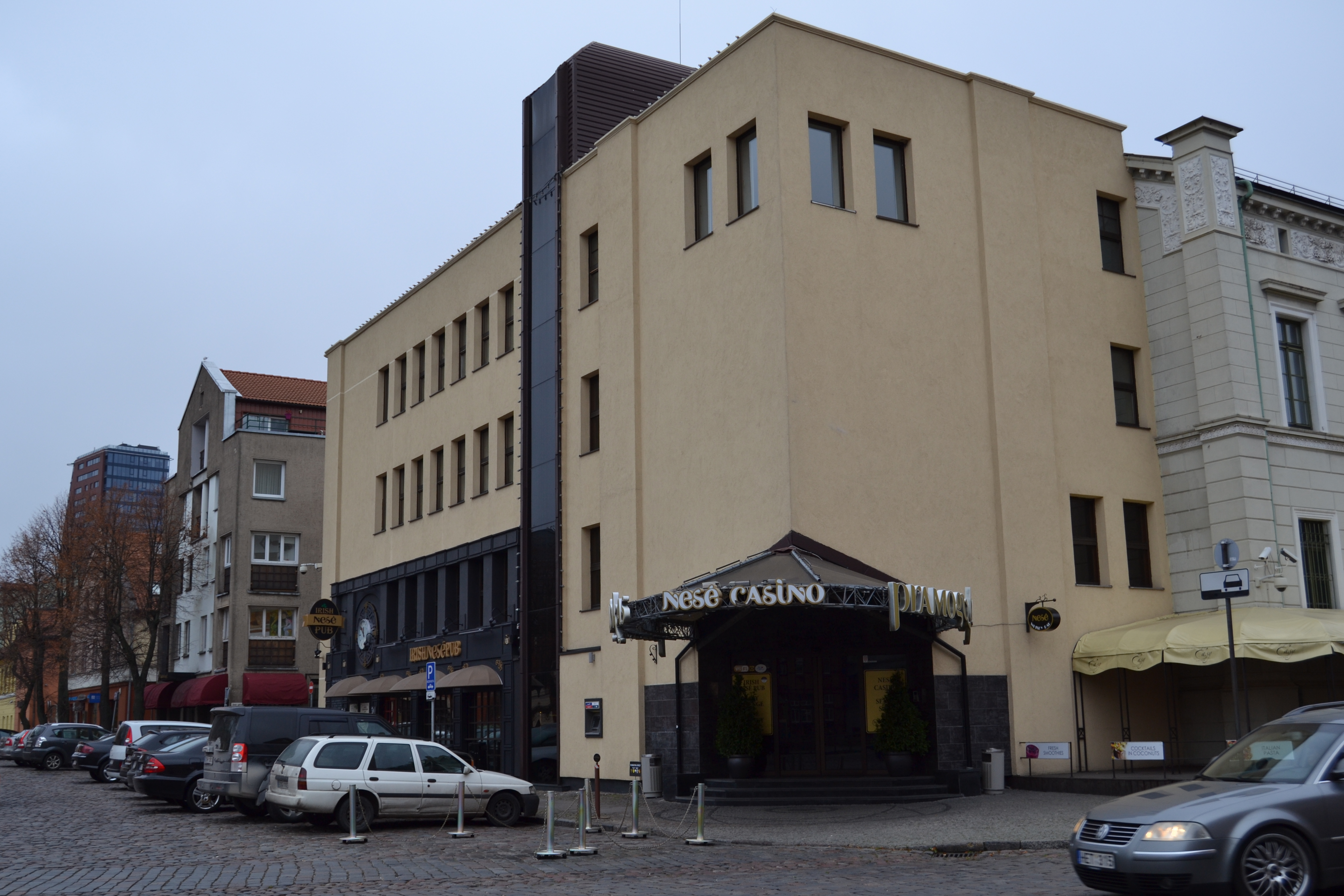
Nese Pramogu Bankas in Klaipėda

Nese Group (formerly Nese) is an entertainment group based in Klaipėda, Lithuania. The company operates casino gaming, betting, and leisure services through several brands, including Nese, Pramogu Bankas, and Sekmes Tiltas.

The group was founded in 1991 and expanded into gambling operations following the reauthorisation of commercial gambling in Lithuania in 2001. Its first gambling venue was opened at the Nese Hotel in Klaipėda on 1 March 2002, shortly after the liberalisation of the market.

The company is owned and chaired by Kazys Paulikas.

Nese Group operates casinos in Vilnius and Klaipėda, as well as additional venues offering Class II slot machine gaming, and an online betting platform under the NeseSport brand. It has also sponsored sports events and local teams in Lithuania.
